The term Line M' may refer to:

Line M, a train line in New York
Line M, a train line in Boston
Line M, a metro line in Tokyo
Line M, a train line in San Francisco
Line M, a metro line in Osaka
Line M, a train line in Tokyo
Line M, a subway line in Nagoya
Line M rabbit, a breed of rabbit